In Argentina, about 10%  of the electricity comes from 3 operational nuclear reactors: Embalse, a CANDU reactor, and Atucha I and II, two PHWR German designs.

In 2001, the Atucha plant was modified to burn Slightly Enriched Uranium, making it the first PHWR reactor to burn that fuel worldwide. Atucha was originally planned to be a complex with various reactors. Atucha 2 (similar to Atucha 1 but more powerful) began to produce energy on June 3, 2014, and it is expected to produce 745MWh. Plans for Atucha III, a third reactor in the Atucha complex, have been announced.

Argentina also has various research reactors, and exports nuclear technology. Nucleoeléctrica of Argentina and Atomic Energy of Canada Limited are negotiating over the contracts and project delivery model for a new 740 MWe CANDU  nuclear power plant.

In July 2014, Russian President Vladimir Putin signed a nuclear energy cooperation agreement with Argentine President Cristina Fernández Kirchner, during a visit to the country.

In February 2015, Argentine president Cristina Kirchner and Chinese Communist Party general secretary Xi Jinping signed a cooperation agreement, and the build of a Hualong One design power station has been proposed.

In December 2015 a new uranium enrichment plant to manufacture fuel for Argentina's nuclear plants, located in Pilcaniyeu, was inaugurated. The plant will use both gaseous diffusion and more modern laser techniques.

China and Argentina had agreed a contract to build a 700 MWe CANDU 6 derived reactor. Its construction was planned to start in 2018 at Atucha, but it was indefinitely suspended  by Mauricio Macri's government due to financial issues. The building of a 1000 MWe Hualong One plant is planned to start in 2020.

Reactors

Commercial

Research reactors

Legislation 
Provinces that have banned the construction of nuclear power plants are:

Chaco 
Provincial Law, Nº 3902
Article 1: Declare the territory of the Chaco Province nuclear-free zone.

Corrientes 
Provincial Law, Nº 4207
Article 1: Prohibits throughout the territory of the Corrientes Province, installing nuclear plants.

Entre Ríos 
Provincial Law, Nº 8785
Article 3: It is forbidden the installation of nuclear power plants

La Pampa 
Provincial Constitution
Article 18: La Pampa is declared a nuclear-free zone, to the extent determined by a special law in order to preserve the environment. Any damage it causes to the environment will generate liability under the applicable legal regulations or as may be provided.

Río Negro 
Provincial Law, Nº 5227
Article 1: It is forbidden in the territory of the Province of Río Negro the installation of nuclear power generation plants.

San Luis 
Provincial Law, Nº 5567
Article 1: Declare the territory of the San Luis Province a nuclear-free zone.

Santa Fe 
Provincial Law, Nº 10753
Article 1: It is forbidden in the Santa Fe Province, the installation of plants and/or temporary or permanent nuclear deposits.
Article 3: Declare the Santa Fe Province a nuclear-free zone.

Tierra del Fuego 
Provincial Constitution
Article 56: It is forbidden in the Province. 1 - Conducting tests or nuclear tests of any kind for military purposes. 2 - Generation of energy from nuclear sources. 3 - Introduction and disposal of nuclear, chemical, biological waste or any other type or nature proven to be toxic, hazardous or potentially in the future.

Tucumán 
Provincial Law, Nº 6253
Article 47: It is forbidden in the province: b) Generate energy from nuclear sources until the international scientific community works out an appropriate treatment for nuclear waste.

See also

National Atomic Energy Commission
2006 Argentine nuclear reactivation plan
Argentina and weapons of mass destruction

Notes
 Dismantled 1984-1989 after a criticality accident. Fuel removed to the United States in 2007.

References